Xylota fo is a species of hoverfly in the family Syrphidae.

Distribution
China.

References

Eristalinae
Insects described in 1944
Diptera of Asia
Taxa named by Frank Montgomery Hull